Valentin Gorelkin (born 25 March 1937) is a Soviet equestrian. He competed in two events at the 1972 Summer Olympics.

References

1937 births
Living people
Soviet male equestrians
Olympic equestrians of the Soviet Union
Equestrians at the 1972 Summer Olympics
Place of birth missing (living people)